Sérgio Francisco Hondjakoff Mendonça (born August 15, 1984) is a Brazilian American actor and singer. He gained prominence for the role of Artur Malta, the Cabeção, for 6 seasons in Malhação.

Career 
He began his career at age 4, working in commercials and advertising photos. At 7 he participated in Escolinha do Professor Raimundo as Rolando Lero's son. He replaced an actor in the piece República das Saúvas without rehearsing, his debut in the theater world. Like Chumbinho he did Clube da Criança with Mylla Christie on TV Manchete. He recorded a CD for "EMI" in the group Terra Encantada (1997/1998).

He debuted in the cast of Meu Bem Querer as Dã. In 2000, he made Artur Malta, the Cabeção, in Malhação, remaining for 6 seasons. Cabeção was considered the most striking character to date in the history of Malhação. In 2009 he signed with Rede Record and starred in the soap opera Bela, a Feia.

In 2013 Hondjakoff worked as a singer. He launched a duo using the name of his well-known character in Malhação. Cabeção and Dino Boyer released their first work song ("Basta tocar o tamborzão") on YouTube. The project shows the actor's humorous side.

In 2014 he worked as a reporter for the Vídeo Show program.

Personal life
In 2017 he began working as a cashier in a New York City restaurant.

Filmography

Television

FIlm

Stage

References

External links 
 

1984 births
Living people
Male actors from New York City
Brazilian people of Russian descent
Brazilian male stage actors
Brazilian male film actors
Brazilian male telenovela actors
21st-century Brazilian male singers
21st-century Brazilian singers